Samba is a 2004 Indian Telugu-language action film directed by V. V. Vinayak and produced by Kodali Nani. The film stars Jr. NTR, Bhumika Chawla, Genelia D'Souza, and Prakash Raj while Vijayakumar, Ali, Sithara, Sukumari, Sukanya, and Brahmaji play supporting roles. The music was composed by Mani Sharma with cinematography by K. Ravindra Babu and editing by Gautham Raju. The film released on 9 June 2004.

The film was a moderate success at the box office. It was remade in Kannada as Mandya and in Bengali Bangladesh as Ek Rokha. It was dubbed in Hindi as the same name.

Plot 
Dharmayya Naidu is an underworld kingpin who lost his wife because he is uneducated. Hence, he wants to felicitate education in his Seema area by constructing schools. He realizes that the quarry he owns has good quality granite deposits. Samba is Dharmayya Naidu's son, while Pasupathi is Dharmayya Naidu's son-in-law. Pasupathi plays the game in such a way that Dharmayya Naidu is forced to give granite quarry as a dowry to Pasupathi's family, due to which Dharmayya Naidu's daughter kills herself. When Samba learns the reason behind his sister's suicide, he occupies the quarry and kills Pasupathi's brothers. Pasupathi then kills everybody in Samba's house in retaliation. Samba and his nemesis Pasupathi take shelter in Kanchi and Amritsir respectively as police ban them from entering AP for a year. Samba settles as a sari manufacturer and trader in Kanchi (Tamil Nadu). The rest of the story is all about how he returns to Seema, takes vengeance against Pasupathi, and starts serving in the educational field.

Cast 

 Jr. NTR as Sambasiva Naidu
 Bhumika Chawla as Nandu
 Genelia D'Souza as Sandhya
 Prakash Raj as Pasupathi
 Vijayakumar as Dharmayya Naidu
 Ali as Samba's brother
 Sithara as Janaki, Samba's sister
 Sukumari as Samba's grandmother
 Krishna Bhagavan as Pasupathi's sidekick
 Sukanya as Pasupathi's wife
 Brahmaji as Pasupathi's brother
 Subbaraju as Pasupathi's brother
 Tanikella Bharani as Nandu's father
 Ahuti Prasad as Sandhya's father
 Chalapathi Rao as Pasupathi's father-in-law
 Raghu Babu as Inspector Tiger
 Mansoor Ali Khan as McDowell Mani
 Venu Madhav as Sanathnagar Sathi
 Riyaz Khan as McDowell Mani's brother
 Sameer Hasan as Police Inspector
 G. V. Sudhakar Naidu as Sesha Reddy
 Sajja Teja  as Chinna
 Prasanna as Goon 
 Pragathi

Soundtrack
The music was composed by Mani Sharma and released by Aditya Music.

References

External links
 

2004 films
2000s Telugu-language films
Telugu films remade in other languages
Indian action films
Films directed by V. V. Vinayak
Films scored by Mani Sharma
2000s masala films
2004 action films